Langelurillus minutus is a jumping spider species in the genus Langelurillus that lives in Namibia and Zimbabwe. It was first described in 2011.

References

Arthropods of Namibia
Arthropods of Zimbabwe
Salticidae
Spiders of Africa
Spiders described in 2011
Taxa named by Wanda Wesołowska